Carlock may refer to:

People with the surname
Dave Carlock, American record producer.
Keith Carlock, American jazz drummer.
Robert Carlock, American screenwriter and producer.

Locations
Carlock, Illinois, USA.
J. J. Carlock House, historic house in New Jersey, USA.
Carlock Building, historic building in Lubbock, Texas, USA.

Fictional characters
 Carlocks are the antagonists of the Regular Show episode "Journey to the Bottom of the Crash Pit", It is based the Morlocks from The Time Machine.